This local electoral calendar for 2012 lists the subnational elections held in 2012. Referendums, recall and retention elections, and national by-elections (special elections) are also included.

January
4 January: India, Assam, Karbi Anglong, Autonomous Council
5 January: Bangladesh, Comilla, Mayor and City Corporation
28 January: India, Manipur, Legislative Assembly
30 January: India
Punjab, Legislative Assembly
Uttarakhand, Legislative Assembly
31 January: United States, Oregon's 1st congressional district, U.S. House of Representatives special election

February
1 February: China, Wukan, Village Chief and Village Council (1st round)
4 February: Philippines, Zambales' 2nd district special election
5 February: 
Ecuador, La Concordia, Join Which Province referendum
Switzerland, Basel-Stadt, 
7 February: India, Maharashtra, District Councils and Township Councils
8 February: India, Uttar Pradesh, Legislative Assembly (1st phase)
9 February: Australia, Lord Howe Island, Board
11 February: India
Odisha, District Councils, Township Councils and Village Councils (1st phase)
Uttar Pradesh, Legislative Assembly (2nd phase)
12 February: Germany, Duisburg, 
13 February: India, Odisha, District Councils, Township Councils and Village Councils (2nd phase)
14–15 February: Kosovo, North Kosovo acceptance of Republic of Kosovo institutions
15 February: India
Odisha, District Councils, Township Councils and Village Councils (3rd phase)
Uttar Pradesh, Legislative Assembly (3rd phase)
16 February: India, Maharashtra, Municipal Corporations
17 February: India, Odisha, District Councils, Township Councils and Village Councils (4th phase)
19 February: India
Odisha, District Councils, Township Councils and Village Councils (5th phase)
Uttar Pradesh, Legislative Assembly (4th phase)
21 February: United States, Milwaukee, Mayor and Common Council (1st round)
23 February: India, Uttar Pradesh, Legislative Assembly (5th phase)
25 February: Pakistan, NA-9, NA-140, NA-148, NA-149, NA-168 and NA-195, National Assembly by-elections
28 February: India, Uttar Pradesh, Legislative Assembly (6th phase)

March
3 March: 
China, Wukan, Village Chief and Village Council (2nd round)
India
Goa, Legislative Assembly
Uttar Pradesh, Legislative Assembly (7th phase)
7 March: Belize, Municipalities
10 March: Malta, Local council elections (half of the local councils)
11 March: 
El Salvador, Mayors
Germany, Frankfurt, 
Switzerland
Aargau, 
Appenzell Ausserrhoden, 
Basel-Landschaft, 
Fribourg, Council of States by-election
Geneva, referendums
Grisons, 
Lucerne, 
Obwalden, 
Schaffhausen, 
Schwyz, Executive Council and Cantonal Council
Solothurn, 
St. Gallen, 
Thurgau, Executive Council
Uri, Executive Council and Landrat
Vaud, Council of State (1st round) and Grand Council
Zug, 
Zürich, 
15 March: Bangladesh, Shariatpur-3, House of the Nation by-election
18 March: India, Udupi Chikmagalur, House of the People by-election
24 March: Queensland (Australia), Legislative Assembly
25 March: 
Germany
Frankfurt, 
Saarland, Parliament
Jamaica, Local elections
Andalusia (Spain), Parliament
Asturias (Spain), Parliament

April
1 April: 
Myanmar, Parliamentary by-elections
Switzerland, Vaud, Council of State (2nd round)
3 April: United States
Anchorage, Mayor
Milwaukee, Mayor and Common Council (2nd round)
9 April: Aceh (Indonesia), Gubernatorial and local elections
10 April: United States, Long Beach, City Council (1st round)
15 April: Switzerland
Thurgau, Grand Council
Uri, 
17 April: India, Delhi, Municipal Corporations
22 April: Germany, Thuringia, 
23 April: Alberta (Canada), Legislature
29 April: Switzerland
Appenzell Innerrhoden, Landsgemeinde
St. Gallen,

May
3 May: 
India, Mizoram, Mara Autonomous District, Council
United Kingdom, Local (including Mayor of London and Scotland as well as London Assembly)
6 May: 
Germany, Schleswig-Holstein, Parliament
Switzerland, Glarus, 
6–7 May: Italy, Local (1st round)
12 May: United States
Arlington, City Council (1st round)
Austin, Mayor and City Council
13 May: Germany, North Rhine-Westphalia, Parliament
15 May: United States, Portland, Mayor and City Commission (1st round)
16 May: India, Goa, Village Councils
20–21 May: Italy, Local (2nd round)
26 May: Singapore, Hougang by-election

June
2 June: Philippines, Negros Occidental's 5th district special election
5 June: United States
Bakersfield, Mayor
Fresno, Mayor and City Council (1st round)
Long Beach, City Council (2nd round)
Los Angeles County, Board of Supervisors
Riverside County, Board of Supervisors (1st round)
Sacramento, Mayor and City Council (1st round)
San Bernardino County, Board of Supervisors (1st round)
San Diego County, Board of Supervisors (1st round)
San Diego, Mayor, City Attorney, City Council (1st round) and Referendums
San Francisco, Referendums
Santa Clara County, Board of Supervisors
San Jose, City Council (1st round)
Wisconsin, Gubernatorial recall election
10 June: 
India, Punjab, Municipal Corporations
Romania, Local
12 June: 
India, Nellore, House of the People by-election
United States, Arizona's 8th congressional district, U.S. House of Representatives special election
17 June: 
Germany, Duisburg, 
Switzerland
Aargau, 
Basel-Landschaft, 
Basel-Stadt, 
Geneva, referendums
Lucerne, 
Neuchâtel, referendums
Schwyz, 
Solothurn, 
St. Gallen, 
Thurgau, 
Vaud, referendum
Zürich, 
23 June: United States, Arlington, City Council (2nd round)
24 June: India
Kannauj, House of the People by-election
Uttar Pradesh, Municipal Corporations, Municipal Councils and Town Councils (1st phase)
27 June: India, Uttar Pradesh, Municipal Corporations, Municipal Councils and Town Councils (2nd phase)

July
1 July: 
Germany, Duisburg, 
India, Uttar Pradesh, Municipal Corporations, Municipal Councils and Town Councils (3rd phase)
4 July: India, Uttar Pradesh, Municipal Corporations, Municipal Councils and Town Councils (4th phase)
11 July: Jakarta (Indonesia), Gubernatorial (1st round)
29 July: India, West Bengal, Gorkhaland, Territorial Administration

August
11 August: United States, Honolulu, Mayor and City Council (1st round)
14 August: United States
Miami-Dade County, Mayor and County Commission (1st round)
Orange County, CA, Board of Supervisors (1st round)
25 August: Northern Territory (Australia), Legislative Assembly
26 August: 
Germany, Dortmund, 
Switzerland, Schaffhausen, Executive Council

September
4 September: Quebec (Canada), National Assembly
8 September: 
Eastern (Sri Lanka), Provincial
North Central (Sri Lanka), Provincial
Sabaragamuwa (Sri Lanka), Provincial
13 September: India, Manipur, District Councils, Township Councils and Village Councils
20 September: Jakarta (Indonesia), Gubernatorial (2nd round)
23 September: Switzerland
Aargau, 
Basel-Landschaft, 
Bern, 
Grisons, 
Lucerne, 
Neuchâtel, referendum
Schaffhausen, Cantonal Council
Schwyz, 
Solothurn, 
St. Gallen, 
Thurgau, 
Ticino, referendums
Uri, 
Zürich, 
30 September: Bangladesh, Gazipur-4, House of the Nation by-election

October
1 October: Georgia, Adjara, Supreme Council
7 October: 
Austria, Burgenland, 
Brazil, Municipal elections
Germany, Stuttgart, 
10 October: India, Jangipur and Tehri Garhwal, House of the People by-elections
12 October: Czech Republic, Regional elections
14 October: 
Belgium, Provincial and municipal elections
Azores (Portugal), Legislative Assembly
Switzerland, Geneva, referendum
20 October: 
Australian Capital Territory (Australia), Legislative Assembly
Palestinian territories, Local, municipal and village councils
21 October: 
Germany, Stuttgart, 
Basque Country (Spain), Parliament
Galicia (Spain), Parliament
Switzerland, Aargau, Executive Council and Grand Council
28 October: 
Brazil, Mayor, runoff in 50 large municipalities
Chile, Municipal election
Finland, Municipal election
Elections in Sicily (Italy), Parliament
Switzerland, Basel-Stadt, Executive Council (1st round) and Grand Council

November
3 November: India, Sikkim, District Councils and Village Councils
4 November: 
Austria, Burgenland, 
India, Himachal Pradesh, Legislative Assembly
Nicaragua, Municipal election
6 November: 
Guam, Mayors and Vice-Mayors
Northern Mariana Islands, Municipal Councils and Boards of Education
United States, Quadrennial elections
Michigan's 11th congressional district, U.S. House of Representatives special election
New Jersey's 10th congressional district, U.S. House of Representatives special election
Washington, D.C., Council
Alabama
Alaska
Arizona
Maricopa County, Board of Supervisors and Sheriff
Arkansas
California
Bakersfield, City Council
Fresno, City Council (2nd round)
Oakland, City Council
Orange County, Board of Supervisors (2nd round)
Riverside County, Board of Supervisors (2nd round)
Sacramento, City Council (2nd round)
San Bernardino County, Board of Supervisors (2nd round)
San Diego County, Board of Supervisors (2nd round)
San Diego, Mayor and City Council (2nd round)
San Francisco, Board of Supervisors, Board of Education, Community College Board and Referendums
San Jose, City Council (2nd round)
Colorado
Connecticut
Delaware
Florida
Broward County, Commission
Miami-Dade County, County Commission (2nd round)
Georgia
Hawaii
Honolulu, Mayor and City Council (2nd round)
Idaho
Illinois
Cook County, Board of Review, Clerk of the Circuit Court, Recorder of Deeds, State's Attorney and Water Reclamation District Board
Indiana
Iowa
Kansas
Kentucky
Louisville, Metropolitan Council
Louisiana
Maine
same-sex marriage referendum
Maryland
same-sex marriage referendum
Massachusetts
Michigan
Wayne County, Commission
Minnesota
same-sex marriage referendum
Mississippi
Montana
Nebraska
Nevada
Clark County, County Commission
New Hampshire
New Jersey
New Mexico
New York
North Carolina
North Dakota
Ohio
Oklahoma
Oregon
Portland, Mayor and City Commission (2nd round)
Pennsylvania
Rhode Island
South Carolina
South Dakota
Tennessee
Texas
Bexar County, Commissioners Court
Dallas County, Commissioners Court
Harris County, Commissioners Court
Tarrant County, Commissioners Court
Utah
Vermont
Virginia
Virginia Beach, Mayor and City Council
Washington
same-sex marriage referendum
West Virginia
Wisconsin
Wyoming
15 November: England and Wales (United Kingdom), Police and Crime Commissioners
18 November: Bangladesh, Tangail-3, House of the Nation by-election
24 November: Nigeria, Adamawa, Local Government Councils and Chairmen
25 November: 
Austria, Graz, 
Catalonia (Spain), Parliament
Switzerland
Appenzell Ausserrhoden, 
Basel-Landschaft, 
Basel-Stadt, Executive Council (2nd round)
Fribourg, 
Geneva, referendum
Grisons, 
Lucerne, 
Neuchâtel, referendum
Schaffhausen, 
St. Gallen, 
Vaud, referendum
Zürich,

December
1 December: Syria, Parliamentary by-elections
2 December: 
Burkina Faso, municipal
Mauritius, Village Councils
4 December: Israel, 
8 December: United States, Louisiana's 3rd congressional district, U.S. House of Representatives (2nd round)
9 December: Mauritius, Municipal Councils
13 December: India, Gujarat, Legislative Assembly (1st phase)
16 December: Venezuela, Regional
17 December: India, Gujarat, Legislative Assembly (2nd phase)
20 December: Bangladesh, Comilla, Mayor and City Corporation

References

2012 elections
2012
Political timelines of the 2010s by year
local